The Argentière Glacier is a glacier in the French Alps. It is one of the larger glaciers found within the  Mont Blanc massif, and is situated above the village of Argentière. It lies perpendicular to the Chamonix valley and falls within the Auvergne-Rhône-Alpes region.

From its source to the valley of Chamonix, the Argentière Glacier is nine kilometers long. Like many glaciers in the region, the Argentière has receded significantly. Between 1870 and 1967, the glacier shrank 1000 meters. In recent years, it has receded to a position atop a steep slope.

The glacier's rapid retreat has been linked to a continuous negative mass balance. A five-year study started in 2004 showed that the glacier had lost an average of 1.5 m between 2004 and 2009, and that there was a 10–11 m loss in average ice thickness from the glacier.

See also
List of glaciers

References

Glaciers of Metropolitan France
Glaciers of the Alps
Landforms of Haute-Savoie
Landforms of Auvergne-Rhône-Alpes
Tourism in Auvergne-Rhône-Alpes
Mont Blanc massif